Aegoprepes antennator is a species of beetle in the family Cerambycidae. It was described by Francis Polkinghorne Pascoe in 1871.

References

Agapanthiini
Beetles described in 1871
Taxa named by Francis Polkinghorne Pascoe